Lake Frome may refer to the following:

Lake Frome, a lake in South Australia.
Lake Frome (south east), a lake in the locality of Southend, South Australia
Lake Frome, South Australia, a locality.
Lake Frome Conservation Park, a protected area in the locality of Southend, South Australia.
Lake Frome National Park, a protected area in South Australia.

See also
Edward Charles Frome
Frome (disambiguation)